SippinPurpp, stage name of André da Rocha Vaz (born 19 April 1996), is a Portuguese rapper. His hometown is Ovar, Portugal.

Career
SippinPurpp started making music around 2017, posting is first music "No meu copo" on March 30, 2017.
His rap name came a little before his rap career, based on the lean he was drinking, as he explained in is first ever interview on Curto Circuito 
In 2018, he joined ProfJam's Portuguese record label Think Music Records and was featured on Mike El Nite's song "Dr. Bayard". The song was a hit in Portuguese social media and got over 5 million views on YouTube.

Later on, he released his first single for the label, called "Sauce", which was a huge success in Portugal, getting over 9 million views on YouTube and 5 million streams on Spotify. The song also entered the top 10 of the Portuguese singles chart and stayed in that chart's top 15 for several weeks.

In 2019, he performed at Meo Sudoeste on the LG by MegaHits Stage.

In July 2021 he will perform at the first ever Rolling Loud festival in Europe which will have its first location in Portugal at Praia da Rocha, Portimão, or not.

Discography

Extended plays

Singles

As lead artist

As featured artist

External links
 Instagram
 Twitter
 Facebook

References 

Living people
1996 births
Portuguese rappers
21st-century Portuguese male singers